Neem Ka Thana is a District in the Dhundhar region in the Rajasthan state of India. Sikar, Sri Madhopur, Kotputli, Khetri and Narnaul are some major cities and towns near Neem ka thana. It is located at a distance of 119 kilmeters from Jaipur and 241 Kilometers from Delhi. Neem Ka Thana is well connected with others cities in the region with roads and Indian Railways. However it is not well connected with Narnaul by road and it causes great difficulties for the daily commuters.

Neem Ka Thana also stands in the race to become a new district of Rajasthan. Major reasons which make Neem Ka Thana a deserving candidate to become a district are its diversity, distance from the district headquarters, growing population in the sub division  and also the dying need of the development. Ashok Gehlot Announced that "'Neem Ka Thana''' is now a District in Rajasthan.

As per Historical records first raised demand for Neem ka thana district in 1952. And after a gap of 71 years finally on 17th March 2023 , Neem ka thana became new district of Rajasthan. Neem ka thana is well known for Ganeshwar dham, 453 years old shri Dhawooji dham temple also known as Prayagraaj of Shekhawati and Mansa temple in Toda.

Well known  for total Solar Eclipse in india was recorded by world Astronomer in 1995 at Neem ka thana this Neem ka thana is known as " Din mai Raat ka shar" ( city of sudden Night in a day ) due to Total Solar Eclipse.

Demographics
  Indian census, Neem-Ka-Thana had a population 36,000 Males constitute 53% of the population and females 47%. 16% of the population is under 6 years of age. It has an average literacy rate of 67%, higher than the national average of 59.5%. Male literacy is 77%, and female literacy is 56%. Neem ka thana is an important commercial center of Shekhawati region of Rajasthan. The total area of the current neem ka thana station Municipality in 1016 hectares (according to 2015).

,

References

Sikar district
Tehsils of Rajasthan